The men's singles badminton event at the 2018 Commonwealth Games was held from 10 to 15 April 2018 at the Carrara Sports and Leisure Centre on the Gold Coast, Australia. The defending gold medalist was Parupalli Kashyap of India. Kashyap did not defend his title.

The athletes were drawn into straight knockout stage. The draw for the competition was conducted on 2 April 2018.

Seeds
The seeds for the tournament were:

  (silver medalist) 
  (gold medalist)
  (Fourth place)
  (bronze medalist)

  (quarter-finals)
  (round of 16)
  (round of 32)
  (quarter-finals)

Results

Finals

Top half

Section 1

Section 2

Bottom half

Section 3

Section 4

References

Men's singles